Eustace Gibson (October 4, 1842 – December 10, 1900) was a Democratic politician and lawyer in the Commonwealth of Virginia, who served in the Confederate Army and in the Virginia Constitutional Convention of 1868. He moved to the State of West Virginia, where he served as a delegate and Speaker of the West Virginia House of Delegates, and then as  representative from the now-defunct Fourth Congressional District of West Virginia for the U.S. House of Representatives.

Early and family life
Eustace Gibson was born in Culpeper County, Virginia on October 4, 1842, to lawyer Jonathan C. Gibson, Sr. and his second wife Mary Shackleford. He and his brothers received a private education, although their father died in 1849 when Eustace was a boy. He studied law and was admitted to the bar. He opened his law practice in 1861.

Virginia career
Gibson entered the Confederate States Army in June 1861 as first lieutenant of the Sperryville Rifles, serving under his brother Jonathan C. Gibson who would rise to the rank of colonel of the 49th Virginia Infantry. Eustace was promoted to captain in 1863 and retired as a result of his severe abdominal wound at the Battle of Gettysburg.
After the war, Gibson decided to practice in the mountains of southwest Virginia, rather than the north-central Piedmont region where his father had practiced and later his brother J.C. Gibson was practicing. Voters from 
Pulaski and Giles Counties elected this Gibson to represent them at the Virginia Constitutional Convention of 1868, and voters from his native Culpeper County elected his brother J.C. Gibson as one of their representatives.

West Virginia career
Gibson moved to Huntington, West Virginia in 1871. Voters elected him to the West Virginia House of Delegates in 1876 and he was re-elected in 1878 after fellow delegates elected him their speaker in 1877.

In 1882, voters elected Gibson as a Democrat to the 48th United States Congress. He defeated local Judge Robert S. Brown, who ran in part on a temperance platform. Gibson was re-elected in 1884 to the 49th United States Congress, serving from March 4, 1883, to March 3, 1887. While a member of the Forty-ninth Congress, he served as a chairman of the Committee on Expenditures in the Department of Justice. His candidacies for renomination in 1886 and for nomination in 1888 were unsuccessful. Afterward, he returned to the practice of law.

Death and legacy

Gibson died in Clifton Forge, Allegheny County, Virginia on December 10, 1900. His remains were returned to  Huntington, West Virginia and buried at its historic Spring Hill Cemetery.

See also
United States congressional delegations from West Virginia

Sources 

1842 births
1900 deaths
19th-century American lawyers
Confederate States Army officers
Democratic Party members of the West Virginia House of Delegates
People from Culpeper County, Virginia
Politicians from Huntington, West Virginia
People of Virginia in the American Civil War
Speakers of the West Virginia House of Delegates
Virginia lawyers
Democratic Party members of the United States House of Representatives from West Virginia
19th-century American politicians
Burials at Spring Hill Cemetery (Huntington, West Virginia)
Lawyers from Huntington, West Virginia